The flora of the Dominican Republic is diverse.

Species

 Abarema abbottii
 Aiphanes minima
 Akrosida floribunda
 Ardisia escallonioides
 Aulacomnium palustre
 Bactris plumeriana
 Boerhavia diffusa
 Buddleja domingensis
 Burmannia capitata
 Byrsonima crassifolia
 Carica papaya
 Cassytha filiformis
 Catalpa brevipes
 Cedrela odorata
 Cissus trifoliata
 Clusia rosea
 Coccothrinax boschiana
 Crescentia cujete
 Croton barahonensis
 Croton ciliatoglandulifer
 Croton eluteria
 Cyathea abbottii
 Cyathea balanocarpa
 Cyathea brooksii
 Cyathea crassa
 Cyathea fulgens
 Dipholis salicifolia
 Dorstenia erythranda
 Dorstenia peltata
 Fuchsia triphylla
 Gaussia attenuata
 Hymenaea protera
 Hymenocallis latifolia
 Jaltomata antillana
 Jatropha integerrima
 Juglans jamaicensis
 Juniperus gracilior
 Lantana camara
 Lilaeopsis schaffneriana
 Manilkara valenzuelana
 Musa × paradisiaca
 Nelumbo lutea
 Pectis glaucescens
 Peperomia alata
 Pereskia quisqueyana
 Phyla dulcis
 Picrodendron baccatum
 Pimenta haitiensis
 Pinus occidentalis
 Podocarpus aristulatus
 Podocarpus coriaceus
 Pseudophoenix ekmanii
 Reinhardtia paiewonskiana
 Senna domingensis
 Sideroxylon anomalum
 Sideroxylon dominicanum
 Sideroxylon rubiginosum
 Solanum mammosum
 Talinum paniculatum
 Tillandsia variabilis
 Utricularia jamesoniana
 Utricularia juncea
 Utricularia pusilla
 Vallisneria americana
 Vitis tiliifolia
 Zamia pumila

 
Lists of plants
Lists of biota of the Dominican Republic